The 1974 Georgia gubernatorial election was held on November 5, 1974. Under Georgia's constitution at the time, incumbent Democratic governor Jimmy Carter was ineligible to serve a second consecutive term. He was elected President of the United States in the 1976 presidential election. George Busbee was elected as the 77th Governor of Georgia.

Democratic nomination
In the primary, Lieutenant Governor (and former Governor) Lester Maddox won a plurality with 310,384 votes (36.32%). George Busbee finished 2nd with 177,997 votes (20.83%), edging out Bert Lance who had 147,026 votes (17.20%).

In the runoff, Busbee defeated Maddox 551,106 (59.8 percent) to 369,608 (40.1 percent).

Notably, Macon Mayor Ronnie Thompson won 21,848 votes in the original primary, due to him cross-filing and running in both primary elections. David H. Gambrell, George T. Smith, and Harry C. Jackson also ran for the nomination.

Republican nomination
In the primary, Mayor Ronnie Thompson (who had been the first GOP member to be elected mayor of Macon, Georgia) won a plurality 17,830 votes (41 percent) over 2nd-place finisher Harold Dye and his 9,870 votes (23 percent) and George Lankford's 8,618 votes (17.95%).

In the runoff, Thompson won with 22,211 votes (50.6 percent) to Dye's 21,669 votes (49.3 percent). Harry Geisinger also ran for the nomination.

General election results
In a year marred by Richard Nixon's resignation just three months earlier alongside the continued domination of Georgia by the Democratic Party and Thompson's dividing of the GOP that inspired leaders in the party to not openly support him, Busbee was elected in a landslide. Douglas and Clayton County were the only two counties that Thompson won the most votes in. Two years later, a revision of the Georgia Constitution was done that included a rule to allow a Governor to be elected to a consecutive term. Subsequently, Busbee ran for Governor again four years later. Zell Miller was elected as lieutenant governor, serving for 16 years.

References

1974
Georgia
Gubernatorial
November 1974 events in the United States